The 2019–20 Detroit Mercy Titans men's basketball team represented the University of Detroit Mercy in the 2019–20 NCAA Division I men's basketball season. The Titans, led by second-year head coach Mike Davis, played their home games at Calihan Hall in Detroit, Michigan as members of the Horizon League. They finished the season 8–23, 6–12 in Horizon League play to finish in ninth place. Due to low APR Scores, the Titans were ineligible for postseason play.

Previous season
The Titans finished the 2018–19 season 11–20 overall, 8–10 in Horizon League play, ending in a 3-way tie for sixth place. As the No. 7 seed in the Horizon League tournament, they lost in the quarterfinals to eventual tournament champion Northern Kentucky.

Departures

Incoming transfers

Roster

Schedule and results

|-
!colspan=9 style=| Regular season

Source

References

Detroit Mercy Titans men's basketball seasons
Detroit Mercy Titans
Detroit Mercy Titans men's basketball
Detroit Mercy Titans men's basketball